The Colt Canada C7 is a Canadian family of military rifles, manufactured by Colt Canada (formerly Diemaco prior to 2005), having similar design and function to the Colt M16A3.

The C7 and its variants have been adopted as the standard issue rifle by the militaries of Canada, Norway (special forces only), Denmark and the Netherlands. Following trials, C8 variants are general issue firearms for the United Kingdom's Special Forces. It is also the standard firearm of the Dutch air force (C8A1) and other specialist users within the Dutch and British militaries. It has been utilized in various combat deployments by Canadian, British, Norwegian, Dutch, and Danish forces in Afghanistan, Iraq, and Mali.

C7 

The development of the C7 assault rifle paralleled that of the M16A2 by Colt. A Canadian Forces liaison officer worked with the United States Marine Corps in the M16A1 Product Improvement Program and relayed information to Canada's Rifle Replacement Program Office. The C7 is much like earlier M16A1E1s, rather than final product M16A2s. The earliest C7s were manufactured by Colt for Canadian Forces as the Colt Model 715. The C7 series of firearms is driven by the same Stoner bolt and carrier gas system as the M16 series. Like the M16A1 and M16A3, the C7 has both semi-automatic and fully automatic fire modes. The C7 also features the structural strengthening, spent case deflector, improved handguards, and longer stock developed for the M16A2. Diemaco changed the trapdoor in the buttstock to make for easier access to a small storage compartment inside the stock, and a  spacer is available to adjust stock length and hence length of pull to user preference. The carrying handle and rear sight assembly on top of the Diemaco C7 receiver features the most noticeable external difference between American M16A2s and C7s.
Diemaco C7s use a modified pre-M16A2 style two aperture L-type flip rear and front post iron sight line featuring two combat settings. A second larger approximately  diameter aperture battle sight is used as a ghost ring for short range quick target engagement and during limited visibility. The wing guards protected front sight was changed to a slimmer tapered round post of approximately  diameter. The rear sight can be zeroed for windage in 2.8 cm or 0.28 mrad increments at 100 m, when used with a  rifle length sight radius. Elevation adjusting can be zeroed in 3.5 cm or 0.35 mrad increments at 100 m.
Not so apparent is Diemaco's use of 1 in  rifling twist hammer-forged chrome-lined barrel and chamber units with a slightly reducing bore diameter over the length of the rifling to increase longevity and accuracy. These features were introduced as the Canadians originally wished to use a heavy barrel profile instead of the M16A2 profile. Also, Diemaco has developed a different mounting system from Colt for the Canadian M203 grenade launcher variant for the C7 rifle family and the bolt and bolt carrier were produced from stronger materials. Further Diemaco optimized the rifle for using 5.56×45mm NATO C77 cartridge L109 ball and the C78 cartridge longer L110 tracer projectiles by using a redesigned buffer assembly, thus making the M4-style extended feed ramps later introduced in the Colt M4 carbine unnecessary. The Canadian military initially ordered polymer STANAG compliant magazines for their C7s. As the prototypes failed the Canadian military trials, the C7 was introduced with aluminum STANAG compliant magazines. The C7 has a cyclic rate of fire of around 700–900 rounds per minute (RPM).

C7A1

The C7A1 (Diemaco C7FT) replaces the iron sight/carrying handle assembly used on the C7 with a modified Weaver rail for mounting optics. Canadian development of rails preceded U.S. standardization of the MIL-STD-1913 "Picatinny rail", so the "Canadian Rail" or "Diemaco Rail" differs slightly. There are 14 slots instead of 13, and each slot is narrower. The height of the rail is also higher, allowing the use of normal-height front sight post whereas a Picatinny rail requires the use of a higher F-marked front sight post. During development, the original rails were vacuum-bonded to the top of a bare receiver. For production, the rail and receiver were made out of a single forging. The mount can use traditional iron sights or the ELCAN C79 Optical Sight 3.4×28 optical sight, both of which can be adjusted for individual eye relief. The optical sight was designed for the C9 light machine gun and includes horizontal and vertical mil-bars used for range determination and deflection, and a tritium glow-in-the-dark aiming post rather than the traditional crosshairs. While the wide aperture helps to speed target acquisition, Canadian soldiers generally forgo the C79 sight in favour of non-magnified optical sights or a rear back up iron sight (BUIS) when engaged or training in close quarters battle. A detachable carrying handle and rear sight assembly can also be installed on top of the receiver. The BUIS and detachable carrying handle and rear sight assembly feature L-type rear sight apertures that are the same as used in the preceding fixed carrying handle and rear sight assembly. In the later years, upon request, Diemaco/Colt Canada would manufacture MIL-STD-1913 "Picatinny rail" upper receivers.

C7A2

With Canadian involvement in Afghanistan, Diemaco and the Canadian Forces developed improvements to the C7A1 to better suit the operational situations at hand. The result, the C7A2, has a four-point telescoping stock unit similar to that of the C8 carbine and a three-rail TRIAD that is clamped on the front sight base to allow accessories to be attached. The selector lever, magazine release, and charging handle latch became ambidextrous. Also, the C7A2 is issued with green colour furniture as standard. These weapons are often seen with a similar plethora of accessories as their American counterparts given the overall commonalities of the system and the rail mounts. The C7A2 is also issued with the C79A2 ELCAN optical gunsight with 3.4× magnification but with a uniform green rubber armored coating, but some soldiers who are issued it have either been issued or have purchased sights like the EOTech holographic weapons sight and the Trijicon ACOG. Within an eight-man section, six soldiers will normally carry a C7A2: the section commander and second in command, two grenadiers and two riflemen, with only the machine gunners carrying a C9A2 LMG. The C7A2 is considered a "mid-life" upgrade for the C7 family. The addition of the TRIAD rail mount has made it easier for soldiers to attach accessories such as laser designator and tactical lights. Many A2's are also seen with folding grips from Cadex Inc. under the handguards which can store 2 CR123 batteries.

The Canadian Forces is looking to upgrade and modernize their stockpile of C7A2 assault rifles, although nothing is yet official or certain as of 2022. One of the biggest upgrades that might be implemented is the replacement of the standard flat-top upper receiver with standard handguards, handguard end cap and front sight base with a monolithic upper receiver with integrated aluminium quad-rail handguard for increased modularity with accessories and free-floating the barrel for augmented precision. This would put the fleet of service rifles of the Canadian Armed Forces on par with Colt Canada's latest offerings and upgrades of the Danish and Dutch militaries who have adopted rifles with monolithic upper receivers. This version will require the use of the Colt Canada M203A1 with a different mounting system due to the new aluminium quad-rail handguard. Since Colt Canada developed and released the MRR (Modular Rail Rifle) that uses a monolithic upper receiver with the Magpul M-LOK attachment system, the Canadian Armed Forces (CAF) might be heading in that direction instead, along with a shorter,  barrel, instead of the standard  barrel, and straight gas tube with a low-profile gas block The possibility of using integrated suppressors is also something that is being looked into. A shorter charging-handle latch will also be used as opposed to the very long C7A2 latch, which gets caught on equipment and vests, which causes the latch to bend and break the charging-handle.

C8

The Colt Canada C8 carbine range are carbine variants of the C7 family, and are mechanically and aesthetically very similar to the Colt Model 723 M16A2 carbine. Colt made the initial C8s for Canadian Forces as the Colt Model 725. The C8 has a  A1 profile barrel like the Colt Model 653 M16A1 carbine, but with a 1 in  rifling twist appropriate for  adequately stabilizing the 5.56×45mm NATO C77 cartridge L109 ball and the C78 cartridge longer L110 tracer projectiles and the design improvements featured on C7 assault rifles. The C8 has a cyclic rate of fire of around 750–950 rounds per minute (RPM).

The rear sight can be zeroed for windage in 3.8 cm or 0.38 mrad increments at 100 m, when used with a  carbine length sight radius. Elevation can be zeroed in 4.7 cm or 0.47 mrad increments at 100 m. Once the iron sight line is zeroed, the front sight post and rear sight should not be moved.

C8A1
The C8A1 (Diemaco C8FT) is essentially a C8 carbine with a C7A1 flat-top upper receiver; the carbine having a  barrel versus the  barrel typically seen on the C7. The overall layout of the weapon remains essentially unchanged except for the upper receiver and the general inclusion of the C79 sight. C8A1s have also been more commonly seen with the detachable carry handle with A1 sights developed by Diemaco for both the C7FT and the C8FT. The C8A1 was never officially adopted by the Canadian Forces and was only used in Afghanistan for the ability to use the C79 optical sights.

C8A2
The C8A2 carbine is very similar to the C8, but having a cold-hammer forged heavy  barrel (as opposed to the  pencil-profile barrel previously used) and a flat-top upper receiver.

C8SFW
The Special Forces Weapon (SFW) features a longer,  barrel of a significant heavier profile than the C8A1 and a Rail Adapter System (RAS) handguard. The SFW operating system is more copiously gassed when compared to the standard C8A1 to enhance reliability in the presence of heavy fouling or icing at the expense of moving the bolt and bolt carrier faster and harder against the accordingly adapted buffer assembly, resulting in a free recoil increase. It is designed to provide a fire support capability in carbine form. A sleeve, called the Simon Sleeve, is slipped over the end of the barrel and is retained by the compensator and its crush washer. It is used to mount standard issued C7 Nella Bayonet, CAN Bayonet 2000/2005 and M203A1s. The front sight base is strengthened for mounting of the Heckler & Koch AG-C/EGLM grenade launcher. 
The C8SFW is in service with the Norwegian Special Operations Forces as their standard rifle, as the more recently introduced HK416 does not feature a "heavy profile barrel" as the C8SFW.
The United Kingdom Special Forces (UKSF) adopted a C8SFW variant, under the designation "L119A1."  In 2014, the UKSF upgraded to the "L119A2", which features a custom Integrated Upper Receiver (IUR).

C8FTHB
Concerns that Princess Patricia's Canadian Light Infantry had with the C8 led to the creation of the C8FTHB. The C8FTHB (Flat Top Heavy Barrel) features numerous improvements over the C8, including a heavy profile cold hammer-forged M4 profile barrel featuring a grenade launcher cut out for mounting of the Canadian Forces M203A1 and bayonet and Elcan C79 Optical Sight.

Some of the earlier C8FTHB carbines used old refurbished C8 receivers. "FTHB" was stamped next to the C8 markings on the lower receivers. Colt Canada later manufactured new lower receivers with C8FTHB markings. Later, C8FTHB carbines that were upgraded to the C8A3 had "A3" stamped next to the markings, giving "C8FTHBA3" markings. Only 400 C8FTHBs were upgraded to C8FTHBA3s before Colt Canada started simply marking new receivers "C8A3".

C8A3
The C8FTHB was quickly replaced by the C8A3, which features the same  cold-hammer forged barrel and flat-top upper receiver as the C8FTHB as well as all the mid-life upgrades that appeared on the C7A2 such as the green furniture, ambidextrous charging-handle latch, magazine release and selector lever. It also includes the TRIAD I rail for C8, which has one slot less than the C7 TRIAD I, to accommodate the M203A1 sight.

Other C8 variants
Two additional C8 variants exist.

Diemaco LSW

Colt and Diemaco also paired up to develop a squad automatic weapon variant of the series. The Diemaco Light Support Weapon (LSW) features an enlarged straight gas tube and an almost 1 inch thick heavy barrel to make the barrel less susceptible for overheating and hence increase the sustained or effective rate of fire capability. The LSW can only fire automatically. The LSW has a boxy square handguard with a carrying handle and a vertical foregrip that can be used as a monopod. The LSW was made with no bayonet lug until recently because of the original bipod. A new bipod attaches to the same barrel yoke as the carrying handle and front grip, so current LSWs are made with a bayonet lug. Unlike many M16 variants, it fires from an open bolt, necessitating the removal of the forward assist for operating safety. It was the only weapon in the Diemaco product line to feature an M16A2-type fully adjustable rear sight, allowing the rear sight to be dialed in for specific range settings between 300 and 800 meters and to allow windage adjustments without the need of a tool or cartridge. The LSW was used by the Royal Danish Army and still is used by the Netherlands Marine Corps (LOAW / LOAWNLD) These arms fire from a closed bolt and also have a semi-automatic firing mode and forward assist. The Diemaco LSW was originally a license produced variant of the Colt 750, but both Colt and Diemaco have upgraded their respective weapons to include features like a detachable carry handle and other features separately.

Other Diemaco variants

C7CT and C8CT Designated Marksman variants
Diemaco's C7/C8 family is completed with two designated marksman variants, the C7CT and C8CT, with CT meaning Custom Tactical. They have two-stage match triggers and weighted stocks to counterbalance the heavy  or  free-floating barrel surrounded by a tubular forestock. A removable bipod, rails for designators, sling, etc. attach to that forestock. A special, distinctive pistol grip is fitted and the C7-style buttstock can be adjusted with shims. Sound suppressors are usually fitted. The rifle is designed as a sniper spotter weapon or a police containment weapon. The CT series weapons meet or exceed all applicable military standards including: reliability in all environmental and operational conditions, accuracy, lethality, maintainability in field conditions and safety.

Custom tactical features:
 Direct gas system: The unique direct gas system eliminates the operating rod and keeps all of the firing forces in line with the bore for maximum accuracy and reliability.
 Hammer forged heavy match barrel: The very heavy barrel profile maintains zero with accessories fitted and provides extra thermal mass to dissipate heat for enhanced consistency.
 Flat top: The upper receiver can be manufactured in the original Canadian Forces specification Weaver rail, or with a MIL-STD-1913 Picatinny rail.

C10 small bore training version
Diemaco makes a training version of the C7 named the C10. It fires .22 Long Rifle ammunition, but is only capable of semi-automatic fire. The polymer stock and lower receiver are one piece.
The C 10 was proposed but never implemented, and no .22 caliber sub-cal system was/is used in the CAF after the withdrawal of the C1A1 rifle. The Army Cadet Corps had moved away from .22 caliber rifles to .177 pellet rifles some years ago.

IUR – Integrated Upper Receiver
In 2008 or 2009, Colt Canada introduced a completely new designed upper receiver with integrated rail attachment system. The front handguard is in this system permanently attached to the upper receiver. The whole system is forged from one piece, and is sometimes called a monolithic rail. This system allows for a completely free floating barrel. Another unique feature is that the system can be adapted for different barrel lengths by screwing on an extension.

The system was introduced as an upgrade in the Dutch army with the C7 and C8 in 2009.
In 2010, the C8 IUR (Integrated Upper Receiver) was introduced as an upgrade by all four branches of the Danish military and the Danish Security and Intelligence Service's SWAT teams, as the "Gevær M/10",
In 2011, the Royal Canadian Mounted Police adopted a semi-automatic only version of the C8 IUR with ancillary components as their patrol carbine.

MRR – Modular Rail Rifle
Colt Canada introduced the MRR, or Modular Rail Rifle, in 2015 and released it for sale to the market in 2016. It is essentially a monolithic upper receiver with Magpul's M-LOK attachment system for accessories. The rifles are offered with  barrels. The  version features a shorter handguard. As of late 2016, the  variant is offered only to law enforcement and the military.

Comparison table of C7 and C8 variants

In non-Canadian service

Denmark

Denmark bought the first batch of C7A1 in 1995 and C8A1 in 1996, designating them the M/95 and M/96 carbine. In 2004 the LSW, named LSV M/04 was added to the arsenal. These are to replace the German made M/75 (H&K G3), which has been the main infantry weapon since 1975.

The C7A1 is issued to standard infantry units of the Royal Danish Army. The C8A1 is issued to units where the physically longer C7A1 can be obstructive to that unit's primary work, such as logisticians, tankers and special units. Jægerkorpset and Frømandskorpset (Special forces) use the C8SFW with a  barrel and extra front rails. The now defunct SSR, a draftee LRRP-unit, also used the C8SFW.

The LSW used to be issued to "support gunners" in infantry squads. However, it is planned that the Royal Danish Army will only use 7.62mm belt-fed machine guns for the support role. Most of the LSWs are intended to be transferred to the Danish Home Guard.

The Army almost exclusively use the C7A1 and C8A1 with the Elcan C79 optical sight, while the Danish Home Guard use the C8A2 with the Swedish produced Aimpoint. The main feature of the Aimpoint is the "both eyes open" sighting. This is the preferred sighting method at shorter ranges.

The C7A1 was first issued to field units of Logcoy/Danbn/Dancon of the Danish International Brigade, in October–November 1995 shortly before the transition from UNPROFOR to IFOR in Bosnia.

On 4 January 2009 the Danish army lost a number of small arms including M/95 and M/96 rifles to armed robbers who overpowered the guards at Antvorskov Kaserne. The robbery was solely made possible because of inside knowledge and help. The police recovered the last of the stolen weapons on 22 November 2011.

In 2010 the Danish Defence Materiel Service ordered an improved version of the M/96 and M/95 from Colt Canada under the Danish designation M/10, which Colt Canada designated the C8 IUR. It features a  free floating barrel, fully ambidextrous controls, flip up iron sights, a collapsible buttstock with more positions, and the Integrated Upper Receiver (IUR).

During the 2015 Copenhagen shootings one victim was killed with an M/95 issued to the Danish Home Guard that was stolen in a home invasion robbery.

Netherlands

After a selection process and trials program starting in 1991, the Netherlands purchased over 53,000 C7(A1), C8(A1) and LOAW weapons  the C7 with polymer Thermold STANAG compliant magazines in March 1994. The most commonly used version in the Netherlands Armed Forces was the C7 with iron sights. The Koninklijke Marine ordered only weapons fitted with magnifying sighting systems to fulfil its  effective range requirement. The  (Airmobile Brigade), consisting of 11 Infantry Battalion Garderegiment Grenadiers en Jagers, 12 Infantry Battalion Regiment Van Heutsz and 13 Infantry Battalion Regiment Stoottroepen Prins Bernhard uses the C7A1, and the C8A1 (Diemaco C8FT) was mainly used by the Korps Commandotroepen later replaced with the HK416, the paratroopers of the Luchtmobiele Brigade (one company per battalion), the Korps Mariniers and most of the recon units of the various combat units, including the Forward Air Controllers and the reconnaissance units of the cavalry and the artillery. The Korps Mariniers also uses the LSW, which is locally known as LOAW.

From 2009 onwards many of the Dutch C7 assault rifles, C8 carbines and LOAW light machine guns have had an overhaul: the black furniture has now been replaced by dark earth furniture. New parts include a new retracting stock, ambidextrous controls, the Diemaco Integrated Upper Receiver (IUR) with a free-floating barrel, RIS rails for mounting flashlights and laser systems, a vertical forward grip with built-in bipod also known as a "Grip Pod" and other accessories; the polymer STANAG compliant magazines became not exclusively black in color as translucent smoke colored Lancer L5AWM 30-round magazines (NSN: 1005-01-657-7839L5) were also introduced along the Thermold magazines. The  ELCAN 3.4× optical sight has also disappeared in favour of the Swedish made non-magnifying Aimpoint CompM4 red dot sight and if desired an accompanying Aimpoint red dot magnifier. These upgraded versions are now known as C7NLD, C8NLD, and LOAWNLD.

United Kingdom

The United Kingdom first selected the Diemaco C8 in the mid-1990s as the Special Forces Individual Weapon (SFW). This selection was later reconfirmed in the mid-2000s, by which time Diemaco had become Colt Canada. During the SFW trials, the C8 out-performed both the Heckler & Koch G36 and the SIG SG551. The C8SFW was subsequently adopted in 2000 under the designation, L119A1. The L119A1 was so well-received, its planned 2014 replacement program was deferred in favour of continued use. Use of the C8 has expanded to include, among others, the original SAS and SBS, the Special Forces Support Group, the Pathfinder Platoon of 16 Air Assault Brigade, Royal Military Police Close Protection teams and MoD Police. There are about 2,500 in service. Most weapons are now fitted with Knights Armaments Rail Adapter System handguards (that hold zero on the top and the bottom rails) and Picatinny rail flat-top upper receivers.

Most users fit Trijicon ACOG 4×32 sights with CQB reflex attachment, but other sights are used. Various lasers, lights, foregrips and other attachments are used. Surefire 4-prong flash hiders are generally fitted, and suppressors are available. The standard Canadian bayonet is issued but rarely used. Coloured furniture is becoming commonplace. The United Kingdom very much prefers polymer magazines to metal ones on grounds of weight and reliability and has now standardised on these for all C8 and operational SA80 users, with well over a million magazines purchased. Many weapons are fitted with the L17A1 underslung 40 mm grenade launcher (UGL), the UK designation for the Heckler & Koch AG-C. Detachable shoulder stocks are available for stand-alone use of the UGL. 

43 Commando Fleet Protection Group replaced their L85A2 rifles with the C8 in 2016. In 2019, The Times reported that the C8 would become the standard issue rifle of the Royal Marines replacing the SA80.

In July 2013, the British Ministry of Defence contracted Colt Canada for a £2.8 million mid-life upgrade of the L119A1 carbines used by the United Kingdom Special Forces. Subsequently from 2014 the L119A1 was upgraded to the L119A2. There are two L119A2 variants: The standard Carbine with a  barrel and CQB (Close Quarter Battle) with a  barrel. The CQB variant has seen the most widespread use. Both L119A2 variants feature a custom integrated upper receiver (IUR) with rails that hold zero all around, a lighter profile barrel, straight gas tube, Geissele trigger, SureFire 4-prong flash hider, a tan coloured Magpul buttstock, Ergo pistol grip, and ambidextrous controls.

Botswana
The Botswana Defence Force uses the MRR15.7M and MRR11.6S Modular Rail Rifle as patrol and Close Quarter Battle carbines. These feature an integrated upper receiver, ambidextrous controls, ambidextrous charging handle, custom folding front & rear sights, tan coloured moe pistol grip and ctr buttstock. They are deployed for national defence, foreign peace-keeping and anti-poaching tasks.

Afghan National Army
In 2007 and 2008, Canada donated 2,500 surplus C7 assault rifles to the Afghan National Army.  In 2011, the ANA gave back the C7s since the Afghan security forces chose the American M16 instead.  Canadian Forces officials said the Canadian rifles would be shipped to Canada for disposal.

Users

: MRR15.7M and MRR11.6S Modualar Rail Rifle used by the Botswana Defence Force.
: Used by the Canadian Forces and law enforcement agencies including the Royal Canadian Mounted Police, Dryden Police, Halton ERT, the Ontario Provincial Police, Sûreté du Québec (Quebec Provincial Police), York Regional Police and Emergency Task Force (TPS). It is also used by the Correctional Service of Canada.

: Used by the Iceland Crisis Response Unit
: Used by the Military of the Netherlands.
: In use with Forsvarets Spesialkommando (Norwegian Army) and Marinejegerkommandoen (Royal Norwegian Navy). Also in use with select agencies within the Norwegian Police, including Beredskapstroppen Delta, the Royal Police Escort and the Norwegian Police Security Service.
: Unknown quantity, seen in the hands of Ukrainian forces during the 2022 Russian invasion of Ukraine.
: C8 is used by the British Army and is the standard issue rifle of the Royal Marines.

Former user
: Donated weapons were previously used by the Afghan National Army, but the weapons were later returned to Canada.

See also
C79 optical sight
C9 light machine gun
List of assault rifles

Notes

References

External links

Canadian Forces website
Colt Canada (Formerly Diemaco)
Assault rifle suppressors for Colt / Colt Canada models
Images of a C8CQB designated by Norway as Automatgevær 5,56 mm C8 CQB
Images of a C8 SFW designated by Norway as Automatgevær 5,56 mm C8 SFW

5.56×45mm NATO assault rifles
Police weapons
Rifles of Canada
Colt rifles
ArmaLite AR-10 derivatives
AR-15 style rifles
Designated marksman rifles
Gas-operated firearms
Modular firearms
Weapons and ammunition introduced in 1984